The SS Abner Doubleday was a liberty ship built during World War II.  The ship was named after Abner Doubleday, the Brigadier General of the American Civil War. Her keel was laid down on 25 October 1942 and she launched 20 November 1942. Abner Doubleday was scrapped in 1968. The photo is of the identical ship the SS John W. Brown which is docked in Baltimore. There are only two liberty ships left,  the SS John W. Brown and the SS Jeremiah O'Brien in San Francisco.

On November 30, 1942 she was turned over to the Sword Line Inc. for operation in support of the war. On May 31, 1943 she was turned over to the Marine Transport Lines for operations. On September 30, 1946 she was placed in the National Reserve fleet in Mobile, Alabama. On February 22, 1947 she was turned over to the Alcoa Steamship Company for operations. She was scrapped at the Southern Scrap Material in Texas in 1968.

References

 Elphick, Peter. Liberty: The Ships that Won the War. Naval Institute Press, 2006.

External links
Liberty Ships built by the United States Maritime Commission in World War II 
Links to Liberty Ship information
Ships Sunk or Damaged during World War II
Ships built at Oregon Shipbuilding

Liberty ships
1942 ships